Sergei Yakovlev, (born April 21, 1976 in Temirtau, Karaganda Region, Soviet Union, now Kazakhstan) is a Kazakhstani (ethnic Russian) professional road bicycle racer. He is currently without a team. He turned professional in 1999 and rode for Besson Chaussures for two seasons, then Acqua & Sapone and then he moved to Team Telekom which became T-Mobile. After fellow Kazakhstani Alexander Vinokourov left T-Mobile at the end of 2005, Yakovlev went with him to Liberty Seguros-Würth team and then the Astana cycling team.  Yakovlev's victories include being the national champion of Kazakhstan in 2000, the 2000 edition of the Tour de l'Ain and a stage in the Tour de Suisse.

Major results

 Tour d'Indonesia - 1 stage (2005)
 Tour de Suisse - 1 stage (2003)
  National Road Race Champion (2000)
 Tour de l'Ain (2000)
 Asian Road Race Champion (1999)
 Circuit Franco-Belge - 1 stage (1999)

References

Kazakhstani male cyclists
1976 births
Living people
Olympic cyclists of Kazakhstan
Cyclists at the 2000 Summer Olympics
Cyclists at the 2004 Summer Olympics
Tour de Suisse stage winners
People from Temirtau
Cyclists at the 2002 Asian Games
Asian Games competitors for Kazakhstan